Colin Maxwell may refer to:

 Col Maxwell (1917–2001), Australian rugby player
 Colin Maxwell (politician) (born 1943), politician in Saskatchewan, Canada